Lance Richard McCallum is an Australian politician. He has been a Labor member of the Queensland Legislative Assembly since 2020, when he was elected to represent Bundamba in a by-election following the resignation of Jo-Ann Miller.

He worked as an official for the Electrical Trades Union, and in 2019 was appointed by the Queensland Government as director of the Just Transition Group.

References

Year of birth missing (living people)
Living people
Members of the Queensland Legislative Assembly
Australian Labor Party members of the Parliament of Queensland
Indigenous Australian politicians
Australian trade unionists
21st-century Australian politicians